Ulopa is a genus of insects, belonging to the family Cicadellidae.

The genus was described in 1814 by Carl Fredrik Fallén.

The genus has cosmopolitan distribution.

Species:
 Ulopa brunneus Singh-Pruthi, 1930
 Ulopa carneae Wagner, 1955
 Ulopa lamia Linnavuori, 1972
 Ulopa reticulata Fabricius, 1794

References

Cicadellidae
Hemiptera genera